Michael Anthony Draper (born September 14, 1966) is an American former pitcher in Major League Baseball who played for the New York Mets during the 1993 season. Listed at 6' 2", 180 lb., Draper batted and threw right-handed. He was  born in Hagerstown, Maryland.

Sources
, or Retrosheet

1966 births
Living people
Albany-Colonie Yankees players
American expatriate baseball players in Mexico
Baseball players from Maryland
Broncos de Reynosa players
Columbus Clippers players
Fort Lauderdale Yankees players
George Mason Patriots baseball players
George Mason University alumni
Las Vegas Stars (baseball) players
Leones del Caracas players
American expatriate baseball players in Venezuela
Major League Baseball pitchers
Mexican League baseball pitchers
New York Mets players
Oneonta Yankees players
Sportspeople from Hagerstown, Maryland
Prince William Yankees players
Tigres de Aragua players
Tigres del México players
Prince William Cannons players